Derek Ryan (born 24 August 1983 in Garryhill, County Carlow, Republic of Ireland) is an Irish singer. He is a former member of the Irish boy band D-Side (2001–2006). He has also established his own production house and label, Ryan Records.

Beginnings
From the age of twelve, Derek Ryan had musical aspirations performing regularly at social events with his brother Adrian as the Ryan Brothers. Having grown up in Garyhill near Carlow town, Derek was bred into loving Irish traditional music by his family. His father is a traditional singer of Irish and of country music.

In D-Side
At the age of 17, he joined the boy band D-Side, alongside Shane Creevey, Derek Moran, Damien Bowe and Dane Guiden. D-Side became a trio when Bowe and Guiden both left for personal reasons. The debut single "Stronger Together" was a hit in Ireland. The band had three other top 10 singles in the UK and Ireland, "Speechless", "Invisible" and "Real World". The band was also popular in Japan. It disbanded in 2006 after three studio albums, Stronger Together (2004), Gravity (2005) and Unbroken (2006). They were nominated for several Meteor Awards, "Real World" went multi-platinum in Ireland, and three became top 10 hits in the UK. Live television appearances included Top of the Pops, GMTV and The Late Late Show along with a sell-out theatre tour and number one single in Japan in 2005.

Solo career
Ryan turned solo since 2006 and changed his genre of music from pop to a singer of country and Irish, performing both his own compositions and traditional songs.

After the demise of D-side, he spent a few years gigging on the London scene, returning to Ireland in 2009. Having studied accounting for two years, he also started writing his first songs. Following many competition victories including "A Song for Carlow" and the "International Song of Peace" and album cuts for various artists in Ireland and abroad, he was offered a publishing deal with the well regarded DWB music in Surrey, UK. He collaborated with writers in Britain and Nashville, Tennessee. His writing ability was seen in his debut hit "God's Plan" that received considerable airplay and used in Irish dance halls and in sell-out concerts in England and Scotland. It has since been recorded by Daniel O'Donnell. Ryan formed a five-piece band and released five albums. His debut album was A Mother's Son followed by Made of Gold, Dreamers and Believers and Country Soul, the latter making it to the Top 10 of Irish albums chart in October 2013. His 2014 album The Simple Things and 2015 album One Good Night both made it to number 1 in Irish albums chart. Popular songs by Ryan include "It's Friday", "Welcome Home (The Gathering)", "100 Numbers" and "Hold on to Your Hat". In 2016, he embarked on the This Is Me tour and is due to release two albums almost simultaneously. This Is Me (full title This Is Me: The Nashville Songbook) was released on 14 October 2016, followed by Happy Man on 21 October 2016.

Ryan Records
Derek Ryan established his production house and record label Ryan Records. The Irish country artist Ben Troy is the first artist to be signed on the label. On March 24, 2017, Ryan Records released Troy's debut album Gravity.

Discography

Albums

as part of D-Side
(For a full listing and peak positions, see D-Side discography)
2004: Stronger Together
2005: Gravity
2006: Unbroken

Solo studio albums

Live albums

DVDs
2014: The Entertainer – Live

Singles

as part of D-Side
(selective. For a full listing and peak positions, see D-Side discography)
2002: "Stronger Together"
2003: "Speechless"
2003: "Invisible"
2004: "Real World"
2004: "Pushin' Me Out"

Solo

Other singles / videos
2010: "Belle of Liverpool
2012: "Life Is a River" 
2012: "Write Me a Letter"
2012: "Kiss Me Mary"
2013: "Better Days Are Coming"
2014: "Raggle Taggle Gypsy"
2014: "Pick a Bale of Cotton"
2015: "Cecilia"
2015: "I Fought the Law"
2015: "Shut Up and Dance"
2015: "Bendigo"
2015: "Break Your Heart"
2015: "Waltz With a Hero"
2016: "Wrong Side of Sober" (feat. Roly Daniels)
2016: "Firefly"
2016: "Won't Ya Come Down (To Yarmouth Town)"
2016: "You're Only Young Once"
2017: "This Is Me"
2017: "Sixty Years Ago"
2018: "Honey, Honey" (with Lisa McHugh)
2018: "Down On Your Uppers"
2018: "Hayley Jo"
2018: "Ya Can't Stay Here"
2019: "Only Getting Started" (with Cliona Hagan)
2020: "On the Sesh" (feat. the Tumbling Paddies)
2020: "It Won't Rain Forever" (with Philomena Begley)
2020: "Wherever You're Going"
2020: "The Road to Christmas"
2021: "The Road"
2021: "The Night that Went On for Days"

References

External links
 Official site

Living people
Irish country singers
Irish male singers
Musicians from County Carlow
1983 births